Britanskii Soiuznik (Russian: British Ally) was a weekly British propaganda periodical which existed between 1942 and 1950.

History and profile
Britanskii Soiuznik was launched by the British Ministry of Information in 1942. The first issue appeared on 10 July that year. The magazine was established as a result of the Soviet–British Treaty signed in 1942. Another publication entitled Britanskaia Khronika (Russian: The British Chronicle) was also started in the framework of this treaty.

Its stated goal was to tell the Russians the daily life of British people to establish a friendly relationship between two nations. George Reavey was the director of the magazine which was published in Russian on a weekly basis. It contained articles about military and cultural events emphasizing the collaboration between the United Kingdom and the Soviet Union and featured writings of the British writers. Children's literature by the British writers was also featured in the magazine. It gained popularity among Russians in addition to the US propaganda publication Amerika. Britanskii Soiuznik reached the circulation of 14,000 copies in 1946 and had readers mostly in Moscow and in a few other Soviet cities. Its circulation was 50,000 copies in 1949. The magazine folded in 1950 due to tense relations between the United Kingdom and the Soviet Union.

References

Cold War propaganda
Defunct political magazines published in the United Kingdom
Magazines established in 1942
Magazines disestablished in 1950
Weekly magazines published in the United Kingdom
Propaganda newspapers and magazines
Russian-language magazines
State media